Twomile Creek is a tributary of the Kanawha River,  long, in West Virginia in the United States.

From the confluence of these forks, Twomile Creek flows westward and southward, through Guthrie, to its mouth at the Kanawha River in the city of Charleston.

The creek is paralleled by county roads for much of its length.

See also
List of rivers of West Virginia

References 

Rivers of West Virginia
Rivers of Kanawha County, West Virginia
Geography of Charleston, West Virginia
Tributaries of the Kanawha River